In particle physics, a pion (or a pi meson, denoted with the Greek letter pi) is any of three subatomic particles: , , and . Each pion consists of a quark and an antiquark and is therefore a meson. Pions are the lightest mesons and, more generally, the lightest hadrons. They are unstable, with the charged pions  and  decaying after a mean lifetime of 26.033 nanoseconds ( seconds), and the neutral pion  decaying after a much shorter lifetime of 85 attoseconds ( seconds). Charged pions most often decay into muons and muon neutrinos, while neutral pions generally decay into gamma rays.

The exchange of virtual pions, along with vector, rho and omega mesons, provides an explanation for the residual strong force between nucleons. Pions are not produced in radioactive decay, but commonly are in high-energy collisions between hadrons. Pions also result from some matter–antimatter annihilation events. All types of pions are also produced in natural processes when high-energy cosmic-ray protons and other hadronic cosmic-ray components interact with matter in Earth's atmosphere. In 2013, the detection of characteristic gamma rays originating from the decay of neutral pions in two supernova remnants has shown that pions are produced copiously after supernovas, most probably in conjunction with production of high-energy protons that are detected on Earth as cosmic rays.

The pion also plays a crucial role in cosmology, by imposing an upper limit on the energies of cosmic rays surviving collisions with the cosmic microwave background, through the Greisen–Zatsepin–Kuzmin limit.

History

Theoretical work by Hideki Yukawa in 1935 had predicted the existence of mesons as the carrier particles of the strong nuclear force. From the range of the strong nuclear force (inferred from the radius of the atomic nucleus), Yukawa predicted the existence of a particle having a mass of about 100 MeV/c. Initially after its discovery in 1936, the muon (initially called the "mu meson") was thought to be this particle, since it has a mass of 106 MeV/c. However, later experiments showed that the muon did not participate in the strong nuclear interaction. In modern terminology, this makes the muon a lepton, and not a meson. However, some communities of astrophysicists continue to call the muon a "mu-meson". The pions, which turned out to be examples of Yukawa's proposed mesons, were discovered later: the charged pions in 1947, and the neutral pion in 1950.

During 1939–1942, Debendra Mohan Bose and Bibha Chowdhuri exposed Ilford half-tone photographic plates in the high altitude mountainous regions of Darjeeling, India and observed long curved ionizing tracks that appeared to be different from the tracks of alpha particles or protons. In a series of articles published in Nature, they identified a cosmic particle having an average mass close to 200 times the mass of electron, today known as pions. In 1947, the charged pions were again found independently by the collaboration led by Cecil Powell at the University of Bristol, in England. The discovery article had four authors: César Lattes, Giuseppe Occhialini, Hugh Muirhead and Powell. Since the advent of particle accelerators had not yet come, high-energy subatomic particles were only obtainable from atmospheric cosmic rays. Photographic emulsions based on the gelatin-silver process were placed for long periods of time in sites located at high-altitude mountains, first at Pic du Midi de Bigorre in the Pyrenees, and later at Chacaltaya in the Andes Mountains, where the plates were struck by cosmic rays. 
After development, the photographic plates were inspected under a microscope by a team of about a dozen women. Marietta Kurz was the first person to detect the unusual "double meson" tracks, characteristic for a pion decaying into a muon, but they were too close to the edge of the photographic emulsion and deemed incomplete. A few days later, Irene Roberts observed the tracks left by pion decay that appeared in the discovery paper. Both women are credited in the figure captions in the article.

In 1948, Lattes, Eugene Gardner, and their team first artificially produced pions at the University of California's cyclotron in Berkeley, California, by bombarding carbon atoms with high-speed alpha particles. Further advanced theoretical work was carried out by Riazuddin, who in 1959 used the dispersion relation for Compton scattering of virtual photons on pions to analyze their charge radius.

Since the neutral pion is not electrically charged, it is more difficult to detect and observe than the charged pions are. Neutral pions do not leave tracks in photographic emulsions or Wilson cloud chambers. The existence of the neutral pion was inferred from observing its decay products from cosmic rays, a so-called "soft component" of slow electrons with photons. The  was identified definitively at the University of California's cyclotron in 1950 by observing its decay into two photons. Later in the same year, they were also observed in cosmic-ray balloon experiments at Bristol University.

Possible applications 
The use of pions in medical radiation therapy, such as for cancer, was explored at a number of research institutions, including the Los Alamos National Laboratory's Meson Physics Facility, which treated 228 patients between 1974 and 1981 in New Mexico, and the TRIUMF laboratory in Vancouver, British Columbia.

Theoretical overview
In the standard understanding of the strong force interaction as defined by quantum chromodynamics, pions are loosely portrayed as Goldstone bosons of spontaneously broken chiral symmetry. That explains why the masses of the three kinds of pions are considerably less than that of the other mesons, such as the scalar or vector mesons. If their current quarks were massless particles, it could make the chiral symmetry exact and thus the Goldstone theorem would dictate that all pions have a zero mass.

In fact, it was shown by Gell-Mann, Oakes and Renner (GMOR)  that the square of the pion mass is proportional to the sum of the quark masses times the quark condensate: , with  the quark condensate. This is often known as the GMOR relation and it explicitly shows that  in the massless quark limit. The same result also follows from  Light-front holography.

Empirically, since the light quarks actually have minuscule nonzero masses, the pions also have nonzero rest masses. However, those masses are almost an order of magnitude smaller than that of the nucleons, roughly   ≈  ≈  45 MeV, where  are the relevant current-quark masses in MeV, around 5−10 MeV.

The pion can be thought of as one of the particles that mediate the residual strong interaction between a pair of nucleons. This interaction is attractive: it pulls the nucleons together. Written in a non-relativistic form, it is called the Yukawa potential. The pion, being spinless, has kinematics described by the Klein–Gordon equation. In the terms of quantum field theory, the effective field theory Lagrangian describing the pion-nucleon interaction is called the Yukawa interaction.

By contrast, the up and down quarks transform according to the fundamental representation 2 of SU(2), whereas the anti-quarks transform according to the conjugate representation 2*.

With the addition of the strange quark, the pions participate in a larger, SU(3), flavour symmetry,  in the adjoint representation, 8, of SU(3). The other members of this octet are the four kaons and the eta meson.

Pions are pseudoscalars under a parity transformation. Pion currents thus couple to the axial vector current and  so  participate in the chiral anomaly.

Basic properties
Pions, which are mesons with zero spin, are composed of first-generation quarks. The neutral pion  is a combination of an up quark with an anti-up quark or a down quark with an anti-down quark. The two combinations have identical quantum numbers, and hence they are only found in superpositions. Together, the pions form a triplet of isospin. Each pion has isospin (I = 1) and third-component isospin equal to its charge (Iz = +1, 0 or −1).

Charged pion decays

They decay due to the weak interaction. The primary decay mode of a pion, with a branching fraction of 0.999877, is a leptonic decay into a muon and a muon neutrino:

{|
|  || → ||  || + || 
|--
|  || → ||  || + || 
|}

The second most common decay mode of a pion, with a branching fraction of 0.000123, is also a leptonic decay into an electron and the corresponding electron antineutrino. This "electronic mode" was discovered at CERN in 1958:
{|
|  || → ||  || + || 
|--
|  || → ||  || + || 
|}

The suppression of the electronic decay mode with respect to the muonic one is given approximately (up to a few percent effect of the radiative corrections) by the ratio of the half-widths of the pion–electron and the pion–muon decay reactions,

and is a spin effect known as helicity suppression.

Its mechanism is as follows: The negative pion has spin zero; therefore the lepton and the antineutrino must be emitted with opposite spins (and opposite linear momenta) to preserve net zero spin (and conserve linear momentum). However, because the weak interaction is sensitive only to the left chirality component of fields, the antineutrino has always left chirality, which means it is right-handed, since for massless anti-particles the helicity is opposite to the chirality. This implies that the lepton must be emitted with spin in the direction of its linear momentum (i.e., also right-handed). If, however, leptons were massless, they would only interact with the pion in the left-handed form (because for massless particles helicity is the same as chirality) and this decay mode would be prohibited. Therefore, suppression of the electron decay channel comes from the fact that the electron's mass is much smaller than the muon's. The electron is relatively massless compared with the muon, and thus the electronic mode is greatly suppressed relative to the muonic one, virtually prohibited.

Although this explanation suggests that parity violation is causing the helicity suppression, the fundamental reason lies in the vector-nature of the interaction which dictates a different handedness for the neutrino and the charged lepton. Thus, even a parity conserving interaction would yield the same suppression.

Measurements of the above ratio have been considered for decades to be a test of lepton universality.

Beyond the purely leptonic decays of pions, some structure-dependent radiative leptonic decays (that is, decay to the usual leptons plus a gamma ray) have also been observed.

Also observed, for charged pions only, is the very rare "pion beta decay" (with branching fraction of about 10−8) into a neutral pion, an electron and an electron antineutrino (or for positive pions, a neutral pion, a positron, and electron neutrino).

{|
|  || → ||  || + || || + || 
|--
|  || → ||  || + || || + || 
|}

The rate at which pions decay is a prominent quantity in many sub-fields of particle physics, such as chiral perturbation theory.

Neutral pion decays
It decays via the electromagnetic force, which explains why its mean lifetime is much smaller than that of the charged pion (which can only decay via the weak force). 

{|
|  || → || 2 .
|}

The second largest  decay mode is the Dalitz decay (named after Richard Dalitz), which is a two-photon decay with an internal photon conversion resulting a photon and an electron-positron pair in the final state:
{|
|  || → ||  || + ||  || + || .
|}

The third largest established decay mode is the double-Dalitz decay, with both photons undergoing internal conversion which leads to further suppression of the rate:
{|
|  || → ||  || + ||  || + ||  || + || .
|}

The fourth largest established decay mode is the loop-induced and therefore suppressed (and additionally helicity-suppressed) leptonic decay mode:
{|
|  || → ||  || + || .
|}

No other decay modes have been established experimentally. The branching fractions above are the PDG central values, and their uncertainties are omitted, but available in the cited publication.

[a]  Make-up inexact due to non-zero quark masses.

See also
Pionium
Quark model
Static forces and virtual-particle exchange
Sanford-Wang parameterisation

References

Further reading 
 Gerald Edward Brown and A. D. Jackson, The Nucleon-Nucleon Interaction (1976), North-Holland Publishing, Amsterdam

External links

 Mesons at the Particle Data Group

Mesons